Donoma is a 2010 French drama film written and directed by Djinn Carrénard. Carrénard was awarded the 2010 Prix Louis-Delluc for first film.

Cast 
 Emilia Derou-Bernal as Amalia
 Vincente Perez as Dacio
 Salomé Blechmans as Salma

References

External links 

2010 drama films
French drama films
2010 directorial debut films
2010 films
Louis Delluc Prize winners
2010s French films